Yukiko is a feminine Japanese given name.

Possible writings
Yukiko can be written using different combinations of kanji characters. Here are some examples: 

雪子, "snow, child"
幸子, "happiness, child"
由紀子, "reason, chronicle, child"
由起子, "reason, to rise, child"
有紀子, "possession, chronicle, child"
有希子, "possession, hope, child"
夕紀子, "evening, chronicle, child"

The name can also be written in hiragana ゆきこ or katakana ユキコ.

Notable people with the name
Yukiko Akaba (赤羽 有紀子, born 1979), Japanese long-distance runner
Yukiko Fujisawa (藤澤 亮子, born 1995), Japanese figure skater
, Japanese singer
Yukiko Inui (乾 友紀子, born 1990), Japanese synchronized swimmer
, Japanese beach volleyball player
Yukiko Iwai (岩居 由希子, born 1972), Japanese voice actress
Yukiko Iwai (Onyanko Club) (岩井 由紀子, born 1968), Japanese singer, actress and former member of the all-female J-pop group Onyanko Club
Yukiko Kada (嘉田 由紀子, born 1950), the governor of Shiga Prefecture, Japan
, Japanese manga artist
Yukiko Kashihara (柏原 由紀子, born 1971), retired Japanese competitive figure skater
Yukiko Kashiwagi (柏木 由紀子, born 1947), Japanese actress
Yukiko Kawasaki (川崎 由紀子, born 1977), Japanese figure skater
, Japanese ice hockey player
, Japanese actress
Yukiko Maki (1902–1989), Japanese educator
Yukiko Miyake (三宅 雪子, 1965–2020), Japanese politician
, Japanese writer, playwright and theatre director
Yukiko Okada (岡田 有希子, 1967–1986), former Japanese pop singer
Yukiko Okamoto (actress) (岡元 夕紀子, born 1979), Japanese singer
Yukiko Okamoto (athlete) (岡本 幸子, born 1979), Japanese female distance runner
Yukiko Osada (長田 友喜子, born 1981), retired Japanese swimmer who specialized in the butterfly stroke
, Japanese swimmer
Yukiko Sakamoto (坂本 由紀子, born 1949), Japanese politician and member of the Liberal Democratic Party
Yukiko Sumiyoshi (住吉 文子, born 1982), Japanese manga author
Yukiko Tamaki (玉木 有紀子, born 1980), Japanese voice actress
Yukiko Todoroki (轟 夕起子, 1917–1967), former Japanese actress
Yukiko Ueno (上野 由岐子, born 1982), Japanese softball pitcher
Yukiko Yamashita (山下 幸子, born 1972), American developmental biologist

Fictional characters 
Yukiko Amagi (天城 雪子), character from Persona 4
Yukiko Hirohara (広原 雪子), character in the 11 Eyes manga and anime series
Yukiko Kitano (北野 雪子), character from the novel, manga and film Battle Royale
Yukiko Kudō (工藤 有希子), character in the Detective Conan manga and anime series
Yukiko Steavens (ユキコ・スティーブンス), character in the Gun Sword anime series
Yukiko Kanzaki (神崎 有希子), character from the Assassination Classroom manga and anime series
Yukiko Satō (佐藤 雪子), character from The Station Master, a novel by Jirō Asada, which was made into a movie: Poppoya, Railroad Man

Japanese feminine given names